Almost Brothers  is a 2004 Brazilian film.  It was directed by Lúcia Murat and written by Murat and Paulo Lins.  Switching back and forth in time between the 1970s and the 2000s, the film follows the friendship between a middle-class left-wing political activist and a criminal from Rio de Janeiro's favelas.

Cast
Caco Ciocler Miguel (1970s)
Werner Schünemann - Miguel (2000s)
Brunno Abrahão - Miguel (1950s)
Flávio Bauraqui - Jorginho (1970s)
Antônio Pompêo - Jorginho (2000s)
Pablo Ricardo Belo - Jorginho (1950s)
Maria Flor  - Juliana
Fernando Alves Pinto - Peninha
Marieta Severo - Helena
Luiz Melodia - Seu Jorge
Cristina Aché - Miguel's mother (1970s)
Lúcia Alves - Miguel's mother (2000s)
Márcio Vito
Babu Santana - Pingão
Renato de Souza - Deley

Production
It was produced by Brazilian studio Taiga Filmes in a co-production with Ceneca Producciones from Chile and TS Productions from France. With a budget of almost R$3 million, it was shot in Rio de Janeiro on March, June, and July 2003.

References

External links

2004 films
Brazilian drama films
Films about Brazilian military dictatorship
Films directed by Lúcia Murat
Films set in Rio de Janeiro (city)
Films set in the 1970s
Films set in the 2000s
Films shot in Rio de Janeiro (city)
2004 drama films
2000s Portuguese-language films